Tagifano So'Onalole (born 7 March 1978) is a Samoan female retired tennis player. So'Onalole made her WTA tour debut at the 2001 Waikoloa Championships. Playing for Pacific Oceania in Fed Cup, she had a win–loss record of 16–19. So'Onalole retired from professional tennis in 2009.

Other finals

Singles

Doubles

Mixed doubles

Fed Cup participation

Singles

Doubles

ITF junior results

Singles (3/0)

Doubles (1/2)

References

External links 
 
 
 

1978 births
Living people
Sportspeople from Apia
Samoan female tennis players